The Parker RP9 T-Bird is an American, high-wing, T-tailed, single-seat, FAI Open Class glider that was designed and constructed by Ray Parker between 1956 and 1962.

Design and development
Parker started construction of the RP9 in 1956 and worked on it for six years until its first flight in 1962.

The aircraft is of wooden structure, covered in fiberglass. The  span wing employs a Wortmann FX 05-191 airfoil and features dive brakes. The aircraft takes its name from its distinctive T-tail, which was an unusual design feature when the aircraft design process was started. Soaring Magazine singled Parker's quality of workmanship out in constructing the aircraft as worthy of note, calling it "something to behold".

The T-bird was registered with the Federal Aviation Administration as an Experimental - Amateur-built. Only a single example was built.

Operational history
Parker flew the T-bird to an eighth-place finish in the 1962 US Nationals. He later sold the aircraft to Frank Wilson of Orcutt, California and by 1983 the aircraft had accumulated over 480 hours of flight time. The aircraft was later transferred to the Santa Maria Museum of Flight, in Santa Maria, California.

Aircraft on display
Santa Maria Museum of Flight

Specifications (RP9)

See also

References

1960s United States sailplanes
Homebuilt aircraft
Aircraft first flown in 1962